Andrey Gimbatov  (born 19 July 1979, Volgograd) is a Russian political figure and a deputy of the 8th State Duma.

Gimbatov started his political career in 2007 when he was appointed the Deputy Chairman of the Land Resources Committee of the Volgograd Administration. Afterwards, he served as the head of the Volgograd Research Institute of Mechanical Engineering Technology. From 2016 to 2021, he was a deputy of the Volgograd Regional Duma. In 2019–2021, he was the first vice-chairman of the Volgograd Regional Duma. Since September 2021, he has served as a deputy of the 8th State Duma from the Volgograd Oblast constituency.

References

1979 births
Living people
United Russia politicians
21st-century Russian politicians
Eighth convocation members of the State Duma (Russian Federation)